Missing Dragons is an EP by A Grape Dope (born John Herndon). It was released on Galaxia on May 27, 2003.

Critical reception
Andrew Bryant of Pitchfork gave the EP a 4.1 out of 10, calling it an "unappealing release with few redeeming qualities". Meanwhile, Andy Lee of Exclaim! said: "In less than 30 minutes, A Grape Dope demonstrates more innovation than many artists do in their entire lifetimes."

Fritz the Cat of Vice listed it as one of the nine best records of 2003.

Track listing

Personnel
Credits adapted from liner notes.

 A Grape Dope – music, mixing
 Kathryn Frazier – vocals (2)
 Sally Timms – vocals (2)
 Doseone – vocals (3)
 Human Condition – mixing
 Designer – mixing
 Damon Locks – artwork, design
 Sheila Sachs – design
 Wayne Montana – fishes illustration

References

External links
 
 

2003 EPs
Instrumental hip hop EPs
Post-rock EPs